Tajareh (also known as Tajra) is a village in Qarah Kahriz Rural District, Qarah Kahriz District, Shazand County, Markazi Province, Iran. At the 2006 census, its population was 603, in 165 families.

References 

Populated places in Shazand County